Max Salminen (born 22 September 1988) is a Swedish competitive sailor. He was born in Lund. He competed at the 2012 Summer Olympics in London, winning the star class together with Fredrik Lööf.

In 2016, he competed in the men's Finn at the Rio Olympics where he finished in 6th place.

He has qualified to represent Sweden at the 2020 Summer Olympics in the men's Finn.

Achievements

References

External links
 
 

1988 births
Living people
Sportspeople from Lund
Swedish male sailors (sport)
Olympic gold medalists for Sweden
Olympic sailors of Sweden
Sailors at the 2012 Summer Olympics – Star
Olympic medalists in sailing
Finn class sailors
Laser class sailors
Swedish people of Finnish descent
Medalists at the 2012 Summer Olympics
Royal Swedish Yacht Club sailors
Sailors at the 2016 Summer Olympics – Finn
Sailors at the 2020 Summer Olympics – Finn